Salisbury Township is a township in Chariton County, in the U.S. state of Missouri.

Salisbury Township was founded on April 1, 1867, and named after the founder, Judge Lucien Salisbury. Judge Salisbury had moved to Chariton County in 1858, and had established a post office in 1863.

References

Townships in Missouri
Townships in Chariton County, Missouri